"The Wreck of the Relationship" is the second episode of the twenty-sixth season of the American animated television series The Simpsons, and the 554th episode of the series overall. It first aired on the Fox network in the United States on October 5, 2014. The episode sees Marge send Homer and Bart onto a ship where their father-son conflict can be resolved, while she is left to manage her husband's fantasy football team.

This episode is notable as being the only TV-MA rated episode of the series due to a scene where a woman briefly flips the camera off, being seen uncensored in reruns on FXX and streaming on Simpsons World. However, it retained the original TV-14 DLV rating when streamed on Disney+, digital releases and further reruns on television due to the scene being censored.

Plot
When Bart disrespects Homer's authority, Homer tries to be a stricter parent with him. Bart later refuses to eat one piece of broccoli at dinner, so Homer decides to sit at the table until Bart eats his broccoli, even though they both miss out on things that are important to them. Lisa prepares two identical-tasting fruit smoothies, one of which contains the broccoli, and offers them to Homer and Bart in an attempt to end the impasse. Bart deliberately spills the smoothies, sparking a brawl with Homer and prompting Marge to have them both kidnapped and put aboard a seagoing vessel, the Relation Ship. Captain Bowditch (Nick Offerman) offers Homer and Bart a chance to solve their relationship problems. While Homer recovers from scurvy, Bart enjoys and excels at sailing and ends up being promoted to midshipman, who can give out direct orders to the crew members, much to Homer's chagrin.

Homer rebels against Bart's newfound position and eventually gets drunk off a flask of rum. When the captain snatches the rum off Homer and reveals that he became a captain, due to him being a recovering alcoholic, the captain gives into temptation and drinks the rum, becoming drunk with Homer. A huge storm begins, and Bart is left in charge of the ship, due to the captain's intoxication. Bart wants to sail around a lighthouse inlet to reach safe harbor, but Homer first says they need to drop anchor and batten down the hatches and then responds to Bart's complaint about Homer ignoring his authority by screaming that Bart never listens to Homer's authority. To Homer's shock, Bart holds out a piece of broccoli he brought from home, eats it and then asks Homer to trust him. Homer does so, and they combine to get the ship safely home, their relationship now in a much better place.

Meanwhile, Marge has to draft Homer's fantasy football team called "Somewhere Over the Dwayne Bowe", despite knowing nothing of the sport, and horrifies him by choosing a roster made mostly of placekickers. Initially put off by the trash talking from Homer's friends, she is advised by Patty and Selma to beat them in fantasy football to end the impasse. She and Lisa study football in detail and realize that a coming major storm event in the U.S. will lead to teams attempting and making record numbers of field goals and, thus, her roster ends up piling up a huge number of points and defeating all challengers, proving, as the narrator says, that "fantasy football is mostly just luck."

Production

In an interview with Entertainment Weekly, Parks and Recreation actor Nick Offerman revealed that he had been recommended for the voice of Captain Bowditch by Mike Scully, a writer on both The Simpsons and Parks and Recreation. Offerman never before thought that he would play a role on The Simpsons as "They’re writing parts for Paul McCartney", and was delighted to be cast as a sailor, due to his interest in naval literature.

Reception
The episode received an audience of 4.27 million, the highest rated show on Fox that night.

Dennis Perkins of The A.V. Club gave the episode a B−, stating “Homer’s journey in any good episode is funny and resonant because of the emotional realities involved, even if, the next time we see him, he has to learn the same lessons over again to drive the next plot. In fact, this infinite cycle is touching in its way, pointing out the futility of the Simpsons’ efforts, even as it rewards them for trying. The show's heart makes the struggle worthwhile, even if there's never going to be any real progress because of the world the show's set in.”

References

External links 
 
 "The Wreck of the Relationship" at theSimpsons.com

2014 American television episodes
The Simpsons (season 26) episodes
Animation controversies in television 
Fantasy sports
Obscenity controversies in animation
Obscenity controversies in television
Rating controversies in television
Television controversies in the United States
Television censorship in the United States